Tack's Beach was a small community located on King Island in Placentia Bay. The population was 252 in 1921. The population had declined to 140 by 1966 due to a decline in fish stocks and the community was depopulated in 1967.

See also
List of communities in Newfoundland and Labrador
List of ghost towns in Newfoundland and Labrador

References 
 Smallwood, Joseph R. Encyclopedia of Newfoundland and Labrador, Volume 1, Newfoundland Book Publishers Ltd., 1967, p. 335-336

Ghost towns in Newfoundland and Labrador